Michael Wiley may refer to:

Michael Wiley (American football) (born 1978), American football player
Michael Wiley (author) (21st century), American novelist and academic
Michael Wiley (basketball) (born 1957), American basketball player